Yulan is a community and census tract in Sullivan County, New York, United States. 

Yulan is in area code 845 (exchange 557) and has zip code 12792. The neighboring hamlets are Shohola, Pennsylvania, Eldred and Narrowsburg, New York.

Yulan is the location of a Roman Catholic church, the Church of St. Anthony of Padua. As of 2014, Yulan has a population of 300 people, 66.5% of whom are married. Toasperns Pond, Montgomery Lake, Bodine lake, and Washington Lake are all in Yulan.

References

Hamlets in Sullivan County, New York